Netviewer AG is a German IT company headquartered in Karlsruhe. The company's software products provide web conferencing, desktop sharing, and remote maintenance capabilities. According to market research companies Frost & Sullivan and Gartner, Netviewer is among the leading European providers of web conferencing software. As of 2009, the firm employed more than 200 people at nine locations in Europe and served more than 15,000 corporate customers in 55 countries.

History
Netviewer was founded in 2001. In 2002 the firm won a competition for startup companies sponsored by German savings banks and McKinsey Consulting in Germany. In years 2006 and 2007 it ranked in the top-10 of the Deloitte Technology Fast 50 in Germany.  Since 2011 Netviewer is part of Citrix Online, a division of Citrix Systems, Inc.

Products
The core functionality of Netviewer products was Desktop sharing, establishing a direct connection between two or more computers over the Internet permitting the exchange of screen contents. The firm products include the web conferencing solution- Netviewer Meets, help desk and IT support software- Netviewer Support, remote access tool- Netviewer Admin and the web-based webinar and webcast solution- Netviewer Present.

Netviewer Meet was available as freeware for private users and as a software-as-a-service or on-premises licensing models for commercial use. The other products are available as software as a service or on premises licenses exclusively.

After the acquisition of Netviewer, two different products, GoToMeeting for web conferencing and GoToAssist for remote access, were released. No free versions were available, only trial versions.

Security
Netviewer products use 256-bit AES encryption and key-phrase-based authentication. Fraunhofer has certified the security of the software in an expert opinion. (The SIT opinion is dated April 2004 and is for Netviewer 2.0 (build 521). There is no opinion about newer versions.).

See also
 Web conferencing
 Comparison of web conferencing software
 Collaborative software

References

External links
 Netviewer.co.uk  English homepage
    Netviewer.de . . German homepage
 TechCrunch on investments into Netviewer

Companies based in Baden-Württemberg
Software companies of Germany
Companies established in 2001
Internet Protocol based network software
Remote desktop
Virtual Network Computing
Web conferencing